About a Boy is a 2002 romantic comedy-drama film directed by Paul Weitz and Chris Weitz, who co-wrote the screenplay with Peter Hedges. It is an adaptation of the 1998 novel of the same name by Nick Hornby. The film stars Hugh Grant, Nicholas Hoult, Toni Collette, and Rachel Weisz. The film at times uses double voice-over narration, when the audience hears alternately Will's and Marcus's thoughts.

The film was theatrically released on 26 April 2002 by Universal Pictures. It was nominated for an Academy Award for Best Adapted Screenplay. Actors Hugh Grant and Toni Collette were nominated for a Golden Globe and a BAFTA Award, respectively, for their performances. The film received positive reviews from critics and earned $130.5 million against a $30 million budget.

Plot
Will Freeman lives a carefree lifestyle without any responsibility or commitments, thanks to royalties left to him by his father's successful Christmas song. Will joins the Single Parents Alone Together (SPAT) community group under the pretense that he is the father to an imaginary child, but instead aims to meet single mothers. Will meets Suzie who he is attracted to but also meets Marcus, the socially awkward son of one of Suzie's friends unexpectedly on a planned play-date. When Will and Suzie take Marcus home, they find Marcus' mother Fiona (who suffers bouts of depression) has attempted suicide and rush to get her to the hospital in time.

Marcus soon discovers that Will's imaginary son does not exist, and uses it as leverage by blackmailing Will to go out with his mother as he wants to ensure Fiona doesn't get depressed again. Though Will shows no interest in Fiona, he begins to bond with Marcus and ultimately matures as an adult as a result. Will helps Marcus to establish confidence, but this plan soon backfires, and Marcus accidentally reveals that Will is not a parent. Fiona confronts Will and demands an explanation. Will retorts that he is only building confidence in the boy because he is routinely humiliated and bullied at school. Though Will promises to cease further contact with Marcus, Fiona recognizes that Will's genuine interest in her son is good for both of them.

Will joins Marcus and Fiona for Christmas, giving Marcus a Mystikal album as well as a portable CD player. During an exchange with Suzie who knows by now of Will's earlier deception, Marcus stands up for Will, and in turn, also stands up to Fiona's confrontational methods. Will defuses the situation, citing an earlier incident where Marcus accidentally killed a duck with his mother's cottage loaf. Marcus invites Will to Christmas dinner, and Will genuinely enjoys his day with Marcus' family. As Marcus develops his first crush at school (Ellie), Will also meets Rachel, who he hits it off with, and for the first time in his dating life, he begins to develop a serious interest in a woman. When Rachel begins to lose interest in Will as he describes his lifestyle, he brings up Marcus, and she responds as she is a single mother and believes Marcus is Will's son. Will fails to correct her, and asks Marcus to pose as his son for a while. Marcus eventually encourages Will to tell the truth, but when Will does so and admits the truth to Rachel, it does not have the effect Will had expected, and the relationship ends.

Fiona's depression returns, and Marcus goes to Will for help. Will, however, is still upset over his break-up and lashes out at Marcus. He soon finds his previous life of self-dependence unfulfilling, missing the company Marcus provided. Will decides to reconcile with Marcus and talks to Fiona about her depression, but then finds out from her that Marcus is due to perform at a school talent show that night, which would ultimately result in him being humiliated for the rest of his school life. As expected, Marcus' performance is greeted with brutal mockery, but Will joins in with a guitar, ultimately saving him from total humiliation.

By the next Christmas, Will and Rachel reconcile, with Will having abandoned his previous lifestyle permanently. Will invites one of his Amnesty International colleagues to set him up with Fiona, and Marcus and Ellie remain good friends.

Cast

Soundtrack

The soundtrack composed by singer-songwriter Badly Drawn Boy was released on 23 April 2002. The film also included music from Who Wants to Be a Millionaire? by Keith Strachan and Matthew Strachan.

Track listing
 "Exit Stage Right"
 "A Peak You Reach"
 "Something to Talk About"
 "Dead Duck"
 "Above You, Below Me"
 "I love NYE"
 "Silent Sigh"
 "Wet, Wet, Wet"
 "River, Sea, Ocean"
 "S.P.A.T."
 "Rachel's Flat"
 "Walking Out of Stride"
 "File Me Away"
 "A Minor Incident"
 "Delta (Little Boy Blues)"
 "Donna and Blitzen"

Reception

Box office 
With a budget of US$30 million, the film grossed $49.4 million in the United States and Canada, and $89.2 million in other territories, for a worldwide total of $130.5 million.

The film made $8.6 million in its opening weekend, finishing fourth at the box office.

Critical response 
On Rotten Tomatoes the film holds an approval rating of 93% based on 187 reviews, and an average rating of 7.7/10. The website's critical consensus states, "About a Boy benefits tremendously from Hugh Grant's layered performance, as well as a funny, moving story that tugs at the heartstrings without tilting into treacle." Metacritic assigned the film a weighted average score of 75 out of 100, based on 38 critics, indicating "generally favorable reviews". Audiences polled by CinemaScore gave the film an average grade of "B+" on an A+ to F scale. 
 
In December 2002, the film was chosen by the American Film Institute as one of the ten best movies of the year. The Washington Post declared the film to be "that rare romantic comedy that dares to choose messiness over closure, prickly independence over fetishised coupledom, and honesty over typical Hollywood endings." Rolling Stone wrote, "The acid comedy of Grant's performance carries the film [and he] gives this pleasing heartbreaker the touch of gravity it needs".

Roger Ebert observed that "the Cary Grant department is understaffed, and Hugh Grant shows here that he is more than a star, he is a resource." The film earned Grant his third Golden Globe nomination, while the London Film Critics Circle named Grant its Best British Actor and GQ honoured him as one of the magazine's men of the year 2002. "His performance can only be described as revelatory," wrote critic Ann Hornaday, adding that "Grant lends the shoals layer upon layer of desire, terror, ambivalence and self-awareness."

The New York Observer concluded: "[The film] gets most of its laughs from the evolved expertise of Hugh Grant in playing characters that audiences enjoy seeing taken down a peg or two as a punishment for philandering and womanising and simply being too handsome for words—and with an English accent besides. In the end, the film comes over as a messy delight, thanks to the skill, generosity and good-sport, punching-bag panache of Mr. Grant's performance."

About a Boy also marked a notable change in Grant's boyish look. Now 41, he had lost weight and also abandoned his trademark floppy hair. Entertainment Weeklys Owen Gleiberman took note of Grant's maturation in his review, saying he looked noticeably older and that it "looked good on him." He added that Grant's "pillowy cheeks are flatter and a bit drawn, and the eyes that used to peer with 'love me' cuteness now betray a shark's casual cunning. Everything about him is leaner and spikier (including his hair, which has been shorn and moussed into a Eurochic bed-head mess), but it's not just his surface that's more virile; the nervousness is gone, too. Hugh Grant has grown up, holding on to his lightness and witty cynicism but losing the stuttering sherry-club mannerisms that were once his signature. In doing so, he has blossomed into the rare actor who can play a silver-tongued sleaze with a hidden inner decency."

Awards

See also 

 About a Boy (TV series)

References

External links

 
 
 
 
 
 

2002 films
2002 romantic comedy-drama films
2000s buddy comedy-drama films
2000s English-language films
American romantic comedy-drama films
British romantic comedy-drama films
British buddy comedy-drama films
Films about dysfunctional families
Films based on British novels
Films based on works by Nick Hornby
Films directed by Chris Weitz
Films directed by Paul Weitz
Films produced by Eric Fellner
Films produced by Robert De Niro
Films produced by Tim Bevan
Films set in London
Films with screenplays by Chris Weitz
Films with screenplays by Paul Weitz
Films about mother–son relationships
StudioCanal films
Working Title Films films
2000s American films
2000s British films